Takakento Terutora (Japanese 貴健斗輝虎, born February 10, 1996, as Kento Mizuta）is a Japanese professional sumo wrestler from Kumamoto. He debuted in January 2014 and reached his highest rank of Juryo 4 in July 2021. He currently wrestles for Tokiwayama stable.

Early life and sumo experience 
Born in Yatsushiro in 1996, he began wrestling in the 5th grade at the age of 10. In his third year at Tottori Jōhoku High School, he led his sumo team as captain to the number one position in Japan. In 2014, he joined the stable of Takanohana, former Yokozuna. When Takanohana retired in 2018 he was transferred to Chiganoura stable, currently Tokiwayama stable. He was the uchi-deshi or attendant of ozeki Takakeisho.

Career 
His debut in maezumo saw him post 3 wins from 4, and his first honbasho in March, 2014 saw him post a record of 5-2. In November 2015 he injured his left knee which caused him to fall to sandanme, the fourth highest rank in the sport. He continued to wrestle in makushita for almost five years when in March 2021 he was promoted to Jūryō, the second highest division in the sport. He lost jūryō status after the September 2021 tournament, but was promoted back in March 2022. He finished that tournament at seven wins and eight losses, remaining at the same rank for the next tournament.

Fighting style 
Takakento's main form of kimarite is oshi-zumo or pushing, with the majority of his wins coming via oshidashi.

Career record

See also
Glossary of sumo terms
List of active sumo wrestlers

References

External links

1996 births
People from Kumamoto
People from Yatsushiro, Kumamoto
Japanese sumo wrestlers
Living people